Otto Zink (October 31, 1925 – May 9, 2008) was a German politician of the Christian Democratic Union (CDU) and former member of the German Bundestag.

Life 
Zink joined the Junge Union in 1951 and joined the CDU in 1953. He was elected to the state executive committee and was deputy state chairman of the CDU Hessen from 1967 to 1992. From 1962 until his resignation on October 18, 1965, he was a member of the Hessian state parliament. He was a member of the German Bundestag from 1965 to 1990. He had initially entered parliament via the Hesse state list and represented the constituency of Groß-Gerau from 1983 to 1990. From 9 September 1981 to 1987 he was Deputy Chairman of the Bundestag Committee for Labour and Social Affairs.

Literature

References

1925 births
2008 deaths
Members of the Bundestag for Hesse
Members of the Bundestag 1987–1990
Members of the Bundestag 1983–1987
Members of the Bundestag 1980–1983
Members of the Bundestag 1976–1980
Members of the Bundestag 1972–1976
Members of the Bundestag 1969–1972
Members of the Bundestag 1965–1969
Members of the Bundestag for the Christian Democratic Union of Germany
Members of the Landtag of Hesse